Nemanja Džodžo (born 12 December 1986) is a Serbian former footballer who played as a goalkeeper.

Career
Džodžo played professionally abroad in Belgium and Kazakhstan.

References

External links
 
 

1986 births
Living people
Footballers from Novi Sad
Serbia and Montenegro footballers
Serbian footballers
Association football goalkeepers
FK Budućnost Valjevo players
FK BSK Borča players
R. Charleroi S.C. players
FC Kaisar players
FC Irtysh Pavlodar players
Serbian First League players
Serbian SuperLiga players
Belgian Pro League players
Challenger Pro League players
Kazakhstan Premier League players
Serbian expatriate footballers
Expatriate footballers in Belgium
Expatriate footballers in Kazakhstan
Serbian expatriate sportspeople in Belgium
Serbian expatriate sportspeople in Kazakhstan